Dattaram Wadkar (1929 – 7 June 2007), was a prominent Indian music arranger and music director known for his association with the legendary music composers Shankar–Jaikishan and as an independent music composer for movies like Ab Dilli Dur Nahin, Zindagi aur Khwab, and Parvarish.

Career
Dattaram moved to Bombay in 1942 where he learnt tabla and the dholak. Shankar introduced him to the Prithvi theatres and soon he joined Shankar – Jaikishan's team as arranger and percussionist, Dattaram managed Shankar–Jaikishan's rhythm section. Shankar–Jaikishan encouraged and supported Dattaram to compose music for films independently.

References

1929 births
2007 deaths
Indian music arrangers